The 1969 Torneo Descentralizado was the 53rd season of the highest division of Peruvian football. Despite being relegated at the end of the 1968 season, Carlos A. Mannucci returned to the first division through the 1969 Copa Perú.

The format of the season changed from the previous season. The season was divided into two phases. In the first phase, the fourteen teams played each other once. In the second phase, the teams were divided into two groups. Teams in first to sixth place were grouped into a championship group while teams in seventh to fourteenth place were grouped into a relegation group. All teams carried their records from the first phase into the second phase.

Universitario was crowned champion. Centro Iqueño and KDT Nacional were relegated.

Teams

Torneo Apertura

First phase

Second phase

Final group

Second place play-off

Relegation group

External links
Peru 1969 season at RSSSF
Qué Level: Arica y un color copero at DeChalaca
Qué me mira KDT at DeChalaca

Torneo Descentralizado, 1969
Peru